Frederick Warren Kelly  (September 12, 1891 – May 7, 1974) was an American athlete, winner of 110 m hurdles at the 1912 Summer Olympics.

Born in Beaumont, California, Fred Kelly attended Orange High School and was a freshman at University of Southern California, when he was selected to US 1912 Olympic team.

At Stockholm, Kelly won his preliminary heats easily and qualified to the final with four more Americans and one representative from Great Britain. From the start, the five Americans ran even until the eighth hurdle, where Kelly and James Wendell spun ahead to decide the winner. Kelly got in front the instant before the tape was broken, to win by 0.1 seconds. He also competed for USA in exhibition baseball tournament in Stockholm.

Kelly was the AAU Champion in  hurdles in 1913 and finished second in 1916 and 1919. Kelly also finished first at the 1915 AAU Championships, but was disqualified for knocking down four hurdles.

He served as the first President of the SoCal Olympians and Paralympians, beginning on March 19, 1949.

Fred Kelly died in Medford, Oregon, aged 82.

A stadium near where he attended Orange High School in Orange, California has been named after him, Fred Kelly Stadium, which is located next to El Modena High School.

See also
SoCal Olympians

References

External links

 

1891 births
1974 deaths
American male hurdlers
Athletes (track and field) at the 1912 Summer Olympics
Baseball players at the 1912 Summer Olympics
University of Southern California alumni
Track and field athletes from California
Medalists at the 1912 Summer Olympics
Olympic gold medalists for the United States in track and field